Crooked Calypso is the third studio album by Paul Heaton and Jacqui Abbott, both formerly members of the Beautiful South. The album was released in the UK on 21 July 2017 by Virgin EMI.

When writing the lyrics for the album, Heaton again retreated to the Netherlands, while the music was written in Gran Canaria together with guitarist Jonny Lexus. The photography for the album was by Sean Welch, the bassist for The Beautiful South.

A deluxe edition was also available upon the album's release, which included a DVD of a live performance recorded at Scarborough Open Air Theatre on 5 August 2016.

Reception

Crooked Calypso attracted mainly positive reviews upon release. Writing for The Guardian, Rachel Aroesti comments how Heaton delivers "observations about British society's ironies and inequalities" with "gusto, his droll lyricism drilling into subject matter from obesity... and the cavernous divide between rich and poor... over a backing of the kind of jaunty pop that can take in folk, disco and blues without ever breaking its buoyant stride."

In a review for AllMusic, Timothy Monger wrote, "There's something refreshingly organic about their big productions, which layer strings and horns over a whip-tight rock combo that sways nimbly between Motown, R&B, and old-fashioned rock & roll within the breadth of just a few notes."

Track listing

Charts

Certifications

References

2017 albums
Albums produced by John Owen Williams (record producer)
Jacqui Abbott albums
Paul Heaton albums